Anomalus may refer to:

Afrotyphlops anomalus, commonly known as the Angolan giant blind snake
Alastor anomalus, a species of wasp
Allomyces anomalus, a species of fungus
Bannereus anomalus, a species of shrimp
Brettanomyces anomalus, a non-spore forming genus of yeast 
Bromus anomalus, commonly known as nodding brome, a species of flowering plant
Cortinarius anomalus, also known as the variable webcap, a species of fungus
Devario anomalus, a freshwater fish
Drepanoides anomalus, a species of snake
Eleothreptus anomalus, or Sickle-winged nightjar 
Galaxias anomalus, or Roundhead galaxias, a galaxiid of the genus Galaxias
Gymnopilus anomalus, a species of mushroom
Haitiophis anomalus, or Hispaniola racer, a species of snake
Heteromys anomalus, or Trinidad spiny pocket mouse
Holcosus anomalus, or Echternacht's ameiva, a species of teiid lizard
Ingensia anomalus, a species of sea snail
Neomys anomalus, or Mediterranean water shrew
Philodromus anomalus, a species of spider
Pholidobolus anomalus, a species of lizard
Raukaua anomalus, a species of shrub 
Sciurus anomalus, or Caucasian squirrel 
Thalassophis anomalus, a species of sea snake
Tmesisternus anomalus, a species of beetle
Verilus anomalus, a three-spined cardinalfish, a species of fish
Zosterops anomalus, or Black-ringed white-eye, a species of birds

See also
Anomalous monism, a philosophical thesis about the mind–body relationship